At present the state of Assam in India has not adopted a distinctive emblem for government use and instead uses the national emblem of India with the words "Oxom Sorkar" above and "Government of Assam" below. In February 2022, the Government of Assam decided to form a committee to consider the design for a distinctive emblem for the state.

Historical emblems
Assam Province of British India used an emblem that depicted a black rhinoceros on a gold background.

Emblems of autonomous district councils in Assam

Some of the autonomous district councils within Assam have adopted distinctive emblems to represent themselves.

Government banner
The government of Assam can be represented by a banner displaying the emblem of the state on a white field.

See also
 List of Assam state symbols
 National Emblem of India
 List of Indian state emblems

References

Government of Assam
Assam
Symbols of Assam